The Glocknerwand is a mountain in the Glockner Group in the Austrian Central Alps in the central region of the High Tauern. According to the literature it is 3,721 metres high, but the Austria Federal Office for Metrology and Survey gives its height as 3,722 metres. It is separated from Austria's highest peak, the neighbouring Großglockner, by the col known as the Untere Glocknerscharte (3596 m). The mountain lies on the boundary between East Tyrol and Carinthia.

The Glocknerwand is a massive, fan-shaped mountain, that has very steep, over  rock faces to the southwest and northeast. The summit region is covered with thick snowdrifts, that make its ascent dangerous and unpredictable. The towers of the Glocknerwand are therefore considered the most difficult summits to climb in the entire Glockner Group.

See also

References

Sources and maps 
Willi End: Glocknergruppe Alpine Club Guide, Bergverlag Rother, Munich, 2003, 
Eduard Richter: Die Erschließung der Ostalpen, III. Band, Verlag des Deutschen und Oesterreichischen Alpenvereins, Berlin 1894
Alpine Club Map 1:25.000, Sheet 40, Glocknergruppe

External links 

Mountains of the Alps
Glockner Group
Mountains of Carinthia (state)
Mountains of Tyrol (state)
Alpine three-thousanders